Larry Joe Baker was an American college and professional football player.  An offensive tackle, he played college football at Bowling Green State, and played professionally in the American Football League (AFL) for the New York Titans in 1960.
He was married and had three children.

See also
 List of American Football League players

References

1937 births
2000 deaths
New York Titans (AFL) players
American football offensive tackles
Players of American football from Ohio
Bowling Green Falcons football players
People from Shelby, Ohio